The Republic of South Africa is a parliamentary republic with three-tier system of government and an independent judiciary, operating in a parliamentary system. Legislative authority is held by the Parliament of South Africa.

Executive authority is vested in the President of South Africa who is head of state and head of government, and his Cabinet.

The President is elected by the Parliament to serve a fixed term.

South Africa's government differs greatly from those of other Commonwealth nations. The national, provincial and local levels of government all have legislative and executive authority in their own spheres, and are defined in the South African Constitution as "distinctive, interdependent and interrelated".

Operating at both national and provincial levels ("spheres") are advisory bodies drawn from South Africa's traditional leaders. It is a stated intention in the Constitution that the country be run on a system of co-operative governance.

The national government is composed of three inter-connected branches:
Legislative: Parliament, consisting of the National Assembly and the National Council of Provinces
Executive: The President, who is both Head of State and Head of Government
Judicial: The Constitutional Court, the Supreme Court of Appeal, and the High Court

All bodies of the South African government are subject to the rule of the Constitution, which is the supreme law in South Africa.

Legislative

Executive

The President, Deputy President and the Ministers make up the executive branch of the national government. Ministers are Members of Parliament who are appointed by the President to head the various departments of the national government. The president is elected by parliament from its members.

Judicial

The third branch of the national government is an independent judiciary. The judicial branch interprets the laws, using as a basis the laws as enacted and explanatory statements made in the Legislature during the enactment. The legal system is based on Roman-Dutch law and English common law and accepts compulsory ICJ jurisdiction, with reservations. The constitution's bill of rights provides for due process including the right to a fair, public trial within a reasonable time.

 Magistrates' Courts – The court where civil cases involving less than R100 000, cases.

Provincial government

Local government

Local government in South Africa consists of municipalities of various types. The largest metropolitan areas are governed by metropolitan municipalities, while the rest of the country is divided into district municipalities, each of which consists of several local municipalities. After the municipal election of 18 May 2011 there were eight metropolitan municipalities, 44 district municipalities and 226 local municipalities.

Municipalities are governed by municipal councils which are elected every five years. The councils of metropolitan and local municipalities are elected by a system of mixed-member proportional representation, while the councils of district municipalities are partly elected by proportional representation and partly appointed by the councils of the constituent local municipalities.

Opposition
In each legislative body, the party or coalition of parties holding a majority of seats forms the government. The largest party not in the government is recognised as the official opposition.

See also 
 Democracy-Dictatorship Index (South Africa is considered a civilian dictatorship according to the index)

References

External links 
 
 Constitution of South Africa

 
Political organisations based in South Africa